Edward "Ed" Chavez (born 1943) is a former American politician and law enforcement officer who served as the 76th mayor of Stockton, California from 2005 until 2009. Prior to that, Chavez served as the city's police chief from 1993 to 2005.

Early life and education
Edward Chavez was born in Stockton, California, in 1943 to Pilar and Santiago Chavez. He attended Jackson School in South Stockton, then completed elementary school at St. Agnes School. After graduating from St. Mary's High School in 1961, in February 1962 he enlisted in the United States Air Force, being stationed in Southern California, Texas, and Vietnam. He was discharged in 1970.

Chavez obtained an Associate of Arts from San Joaquin Delta College in 1970, earned a Bachelor of Arts in Criminal Justice from California State University, Sacramento in 1972, and a Master of Science in Management from Cal Poly Pomona in 1992.

Stockton Police
Chavez joined the Stockton Police Department in 1973 as a police officer. Aside from being an officer, he also served as a sergeant, lieutenant, captain, and deputy chief. He became Chief of Police in February 1993.

Political career
Chavez was elected mayor of Stockton in the 2004 election, winning with 52.2% of the vote. He was sworn in on January 1, 2005, succeeding Gary Podesto. As mayor he was a member of the Mayors Against Illegal Guns Coalition. He initially said he would likely run for re-election in 2008, but on December 18, 2007, Chavez announced he would leave at the end of his term, saying it was time for him and his wife, Barbara, to live a private life.

Personal life
Chavez has two children, a son, Eric, and a daughter, Jill. Upon his term as mayor ending, Chavez now resides in Indio, California.

Electoral history

References 

California State Polytechnic University, Pomona alumni
California State University, Sacramento alumni
American police chiefs
Living people
Mayors of Stockton, California
California Republicans
21st-century American politicians
1943 births